Aculepeira is a genus of  orb-weaver spiders first described by R. V. Chamberlin & Wilton Ivie in 1942.

Species
 it contains twenty-seven species:
Aculepeira aculifera (O. Pickard-Cambridge, 1889) – USA to Guatemala
Aculepeira albovittata (Mello-Leitão, 1941) – Paraguay, Argentina
Aculepeira angeloi Álvares, Loyola & De Maria, 2005 – Brazil
Aculepeira apa Levi, 1991 – Paraguay
Aculepeira armida (Audouin, 1826) – Southern Europe, Turkey, Israel, Russia (Europe to Far East), Central Asia to China
Aculepeira a. orientalis (Kulczyński, 1901) – Russia (Asia), China
Aculepeira a. pumila (Simon, 1929) – France
Aculepeira azul Levi, 1991 – Panama
Aculepeira busu Levi, 1991 – Hispaniola
Aculepeira carbonaria (L. Koch, 1869) – Alps, southern Europe, Turkey, Russia (Europe and Central Asia), Kazakhstan, China
Aculepeira c. sinensis (Schenkel, 1953) – China
Aculepeira carbonarioides (Keyserling, 1892) – USA, Canada, Russia (Europe to Far East)
Aculepeira ceropegia (Walckenaer, 1802) – Europe, Turkey, Caucasus, Russia (Europe to West Siberia), Kazakhstan, Iran?
Aculepeira escazu Levi, 1991 – Costa Rica
Aculepeira gravabilis (O. Pickard-Cambridge, 1889) – Honduras to Panama
Aculepeira lapponica (Holm, 1945) – Sweden, Finland, Russia (West Siberia)
Aculepeira luosangensis Yin, Wang, Xie & Peng, 1990 – China
Aculepeira machu Levi, 1991 – Peru
Aculepeira matsudae Tanikawa, 1994 – Japan
Aculepeira morenoae Rubio, Izquierdo & Piacentini, 2013 – Argentina
Aculepeira packardi (Thorell, 1875) – North America, Russia (Urals to Far East), Kazakhstan, China
Aculepeira serpentina Guo & Zhang, 2010 – China
Aculepeira taibaishanensis Zhu & Wang, 1995 – China
Aculepeira talishia (Zawadsky, 1902) – Turkey, Iran, Caucasus to Central Asia
Aculepeira travassosi (Soares & Camargo, 1948) – Mexico to Argentina
Aculepeira visite Levi, 1991 – Hispaniola
Aculepeira vittata (Gerschman & Schiapelli, 1948) – Brazil, Paraguay, Argentina

References 

 
Araneidae
Araneomorphae genera
Cosmopolitan spiders
Taxa named by Ralph Vary Chamberlin
Taxa named by Wilton Ivie